Qasmi is a village and union council in Mardan District of Khyber Pakhtunkhwa. Qasmi is located about 35 km to the North East from Mardan City. The Village is surrounded by a beautiful river from 3 directions which flows throughout the year. It has a population of approximately 5,000 people.
This village has a very fertile agricultural land. Various kind of crops like wheat, maiz, sugarcane, tobacco are produced as  well as many vegetables and fruits. The main source of the irrigation is the canal system which was developed during the British era.
Qasmi is a very beautiful village, located in between village Tazagram, Sarobi, Alo & Alam Ganj, and is situated in the North of Mardan city at a distance of about 35 kilometers. The Police station of the locality is Baizo Kharky. The nearest towns are Katlang at distance of 11 kilometers & Lund Khwar at the distance of 17 kilometers. Its geographical coordinates are 34 degrees, 27feet, 17 inches North and 72 degrees, 3 feet,7 inches East.

Education was rare in the bygone time but now the people of Qasmi, Tazagram and Sarobi can be regarded as the most educated among other villages of the district. One can find here qualified graduates (male and female) in every subject. We have now masters in Mathematics, Chemistry, Physics, Aeronautical engineers, Charted Accountants, Veterinary doctors, Computer scientists, Statistics, Zoology, English, Urdu, Islamiyat, Political Science, Computer Science, Sociology, Pashto, Business Administration and Commerce. In short, one can find a master's degree holder at least in every home. 
There is a Government Higher Secondary School for boys, a primary school for boys, a primary school for girls (Mianjee Abad), a Higher Secondary school for girls, two private schools for boys (The Qasmi Model School,Islamia Public School Qasmi and Spring Public School Qasmi).

Indeed, Qasmi and its nearby villages are rich in their culture, history and traditions.

The people are very much aware of the use of advance tools and technologies of the age in every field of life. Internet is at the top among these. The agriculture has seen a visible advancement with the use of new tools and machinery. The transport has been improved at a noticing level.

References

Union councils of Mardan District
Populated places in Mardan District